Western Springs College is a state co-educational secondary school located in Western Springs, an inner suburb of Auckland, New Zealand. The school educates approximately  students, from Years 9 to 13 (ages 13 to 18). The school was originally part of Seddon Memorial Technical College, but was moved to the current Western Springs site in 1964.

History
The school was originally called Seddon Memorial Technical College even after being resited to Motions Rd till 1968 when renamed Seddon High school.. In November 1989, it opened its doors for the first 400 people, 10% of which were Māori. In 1995, the school had established a Māori language immersion unit called a Rūmaki, and brought another 200 students.

Facilities
The Auckland Performing Arts Centre (TAPAC) is located, within the school grounds.

Uniform
The school is one of few in the Auckland area to have no formal uniform. The school sees the development of sensible attitudes towards dress and appearance as part of the education process and tidy dress standards, as an enforced part of the education system. However, the Rumaki unit has set of uniform for both male and female students, but only on formal occasions such as a pōwhiri, or prizegiving do they wear it.

Houses
The school consists of five houses:
Atea (Red), meaning Wind or Air
Moana (Blue), meaning Ocean
Whenua (Green), meaning Land
Kapura (Yellow), meaning Fire
Oranga (Purple), meaning Life

Enrollment and donation
The school operates an enrollment zone which entitles students residing within the zone to enroll at the school. Students from outside the zone may be admitted through a ballot system. A voluntary donation to cover costs is requested at the time of enrollment.

Academic achievement
The results from the school's 2005 NCEA examinations placed it as the top decile 7 school for NCEA Level 1. The school is strong in debating, with both teams in the final of the 2005 Auckland Senior Debating competition representing Western Springs College. The school is also strong in spoken word. The school won an award this year, in the 2018 Spoken Word Grand Slam Final. The victors are: Manaia Tuwhare-Hoani, Arihia Hall, Matariki Bennett and Terina Wichman-Evans.

In 2015, Mercy Williams of Western Springs College had won $500 at the Play It Strange Wero Songwriting Competition for her song, Embrace the Day.

Demographics and rankings
Last visited by Education Review Office (ERO) on 19 June 2015. The next review is due in 4–5 years (2019-2020).

Western Springs College had 1500 students enrolled. Fifty-six percent of students were male, and 44% were female. Fifty-five percent identified themselves as New Zealand European, 27% identified as Māori, 3% as Samoans, 2% as Cook Islanders, 1% as Tongan and Niue and 14% Asian.

The school also has 107 international students who come from Brazil, Chile, China, Japan, Korea, and Thailand.

In 2016, the school was the top-ranked school for both boys and girls, by the Metro Magazine.

Notable alumni
Che Fu
Joel Little
Nesian Mystik
Courtney Sina Meredith
Supergroove

References

External links
Official school website

Secondary schools in Auckland